Pocono Lake Preserve is an unincorporated private development located in Tobyhanna Township in Monroe County, Pennsylvania. Pocono Lake Preserve is located on the north shore of Pocono Lake, south of Pennsylvania Route 940 between Blakeslee and Pocono Pines.

References

Unincorporated communities in Monroe County, Pennsylvania
Unincorporated communities in Pennsylvania